The 1984–85 West Midlands (Regional) League season was the 85th in the history of the West Midlands (Regional) League, an English association football competition for semi-professional and amateur teams based in the West Midlands county, Shropshire, Herefordshire, Worcestershire and southern Staffordshire.

Premier Division

The Premier Division featured 18 clubs which competed in the division last season, along with two new clubs:
Tamworth, relegated from the Southern League
Tipton Town, promoted from Division One

League table

References

External links

1984–85
8